Sandhyavandanam (Sanskrit: , , lit. 'salutation to (Goddess) Twilight' or 'salutation during the twilight') 
is a mandatory religious ritual centring around the recitation of the Gayatri mantra, traditionally supposed to be performed three times a day by Dvija communities of Hindus, particularly those initiated through the sacred thread ceremony referred to as the Upanayanam and instructed in its execution by a Guru, in this case one qualified to teach Vedic ritual. Sandhyopasana is considered as a path to attain salvation (moksha).

Practice of Sandhyā in Ramayana and Mahabharata by Rama and Krishna can be observed. In Balakanda (23.2, 23.2) of Ramayana, Viswamitra wakes Rama and Lakshmana up at the  break of the dawn for the worship of sandhyā. In Udyogaparva (82.21) of Mahabharata there is reference to Krishna performing Sandhya.

Definition of Sandhyā

Sir Monier-Williams translated  as twilight (i.e. the period between night and day), as well as "the religious acts performed by Brahmans and twice-born men at the above three divisions of the day".  The Sandhyāvandanam consists of ritual recitation from the Vedas. These rituals are performed three times a day - at morning, noon and evening.

The Gayatri mantra

The Gayatri mantra, the central mantra of the Sandhyavandanam, has 24 syllables:

 
 
 
 
– Rigveda 3.62.10

Stephanie W. Jamison and Joel P. Brereton translated the mantra as, "Might we make our own that desirable effulgence of god Savitar, who will rouse forth our insights."

Sandhyākāla

Sandhyākāla is also defined as the time to perform Sandhyā. Traditionally, the day is divided by 5 parts, each having an interval of 2 hour and 24 minutes. They are prātaḥ-kālaḥ (early morning), pūrvahna (forenoon), madhyāhna (around noon), aparāhna (afternoon), sāyāhna (evening). As per Hindu traditional calendar, the day which starts with sunrise (i.e. from midnight of previous night until sunrise is considered part of previous day).

A Sandhyākāla is 72 minutes (i.e. 3 ghaṭīs of 24 minutes).
 Prātassandhyā spans from two ghaṭīs before sunrise and until one ghaṭī after. 
 Madhyāhna sandhyā spans from one and half ghaṭī before noon and until one and half ghaṭī after.
 Sāyam sandhyā spans from one ghaṭī before sunset and until two ghaṭīs after.

Direction of Sandhyāvandanam 
The Sandhyāvandanam is traditionally done facing the east in the morning sandhyā (doing Gāyatrījapa until sunrise), the north in the noon and the west in the evening sandhyā (doing Gāyatrījapa until stars rise). In the evening, only āchamana part is performed in east or north.

Parts of Sandhyā Vandanam
As per the work Sandhyātattvasubhodini, the Sāṅgopāṅga Sandhyāvandanam (lit. Sandhyāvandanam with all the essential and subsidiary parts) consists of different components termed as aṅgas (lit. limbs). Apart from the principal aṅgi it has 5 anterior parts (pūrvāṅga) and 5 posterior parts (uttarāṅga).

Before commencement of the 5 pūrvāṅgas, there are 3 angas: Ācamanaṃ (आचमनम्), Prāṇāyāmaḥ (प्राणायामः) and Sankalpaḥ (सङ्कल्पः), which are not mentioned separately. These 5 pūrvāṅgas are:
 Prathama Mārjanaṃ (प्रथममार्जनम्, First cleansing)
 Mantrācamanaṃ (मन्त्राचमनम्, Water-sipping via Vedic mantras)
 Punarmārjanaṃ  (पुनर्मार्जनम्, Second cleansing. Also known as Dvitīyamārjanaṃ)
 Pāpavimocana Mantram (पापविमोचन मन्त्रम्, Liberation from sins. Also known as Aghamarṣaṇa)
 Arghyapradānam (अर्घ्यप्रदानम्, Offering of water to the Sun (Sūrya))
The principal part is the Sandhyopāsanā mantram (सन्ध्योपासना मन्त्रम्), which involves contemplation on Brahman, referred as 'Brahmabhāvanam'. This Upāsanā mantra is also referred as Dhyānam part in Sandhyāvandanam by the smritis. However, few smritis such as by Manu and Āśvalāyana consider Gāyatrījapaḥ as the principle one.
The 5 uttarāṅgas are:
 Gāyatrījapaḥ (गायत्रीजपः, Deep meditation with the chanting of Gayatri mantra) 
 Sūrya-Upasthānaṃ (सूर्योपस्थानम्, Adoration in the presence of the Sun with Vedic mantras)
 Dik Namaskāraḥ (दिङ्नमस्कारः, Salutation to the Devatas in all the cardinal directions)
 Bhūmyākāśa ābhivandanam (भूम्याकाशाभिवन्दनम्, Respectful salutation to the Sky (Dyaus Pitṛ) and the Earth (pṛthivī))
 Abhivādanam (अभिवादनम्, Formal salutation by reciting ones' Gotra and Pravara)

In addition to the above Vedic components of the Sandhyāvandanam, many include the following due to Tantric influences:
 Gayatri tarpaṇaṃ (तर्पणम्), nyāsa (न्यासः) and Mudrāpradarśanam (मुद्राप्रदर्शनम्) are performed in Yajurveda Sandhyāvandanam due to Śiṣṭācāra.
 Navagraha tarpaṇam are offerings made every day to each of the 9 planets.

Accessories for Sandhyā

Pañcapātra
A Pañcapātra is the set of holy utensils used for Hindu rituals containing plate (thāḷī, laghupātra) and ritualistic spoon (uddhariṇī/ācamanī).

Āsana
As per vyāsa and parāśara, a seat (Āsana) for japa is traditionally made of silk (kauśeya) or blanket (kambala) or skin (ajina) or wood (dāruja) or (palm) leaves (tālapatra). Hindu texts cite various spiritual and material benefits or drawbacks depending on different materials used for the seat.

Japamāla
A Japamāla is often used for counting the number of recitations in Gayatri japa. An Āsanamantra typically chanted before taking seat.

Tilakadhāraṇa
The Tilakadhāraṇa is a holy mark (Tilaka) made on the forehead as per the local tradition before commencement of Sandhyā. Kumkuma, gandha, gopichandana and bhasma are often used for marking. Saivaites and Smartas mark tripuṇḍram, while, vaishnavaites mark ūrdhvapuṇḍram. Tripuṇḍram (Sanskrit:त्रिपुण्ड्रम्) or Tripuṇḍraka refers to the “three parallel lines of ash marks over the forehead”, according to the Śivapurāṇa 1.18. Ūrddhvapuṇḍram (ऊर्द्ध्वपुण्ड्रम्) is a perpendicular line on the forehead made with Sandal, &c. a Vaishnava mark. Traditional authorities strictly advised against doing Sandhyā without tilakadhāraṇa.

Upavītam
The yajñopavītam (Sanskrit: यज्ञोपवीतम्, sacred thread) worn as upavīta (i.e.  in the proper manner of wearing it from over the left shoulder and under the right arm) is cited as a necessity for performing the Sandhyavandanam.

Yajurveda Sandhyāvandanam
It is usual practice to recite mantras from one's own Veda in Sandhyāvandanam. The procedure below are given taken from the Taittirīya śākha of (Kriṣna) Yajurveda as followed by Telugu people adhering to the smarta tradition. The mantras used in Prāṇāyāma, Mantrācamana, Gāyatrī āhvānam, Devatānamaskāraḥ and Gāyatrī Prasthānam are directly from Mahanarayana Upanishad (Andhra rescension containing 80 anuvakas).

Mānasasnānam
Sandhyāvandanam starts with mānasasnānam (lit. mind bath) that involves viṣṇusmaraṇaṃ (remembrance of Vishnu):

By uttering the above chant, water is sprinkled on head three times.

Ācamana

Achamana involves sipping of water three times without thinking of the self in any way, but meditating on the ‘Supreme Atman”.

Achamana is done only in two directions, the East or North. There are three types of Āchamanam, namely, Śrautācamanam, Smṛtyācamanam and Purāṇācamanam.

Since, this is the first āchamana in Sandhyāvandanam, the sipping of water should be Purāṇācamana (i.e. 24 names of Vishnu starting with Om Keśavāya swāha & Co). Then, one Smṛtyācāmana and Bhūtocchāṭana are performed.

Prāṇāyāma
Prāṇāyāma refers to the practice of controlled breathing in meditation. It consists of three processes, first is inhalation that involves breathing in slowly through the right nostril; called as pūraka (पूरकः). The second is retention that involves retaining the breath by closing both nostrils, for a period more or less prolonged; called as kumbhaka (कुम्भक). As per Yajnavalkya smriti, the Gayatri mantra with its śiras (head) and preceded by the 7 vyāhṛtīs; to each of which the syllable Om should be added. This chanting has to be done thrice during kumbhaka. Then, the third is exhalation that involves breathing out slowly through the other nostril; called as recaka (रेचकः).

Sankalpa
Sankalpa means taking the resolve.

Then, Jalābhimantraṇam is done while reciting the Gayatri mantra to purify the water just before Prathama Mārjana.

Prathama Mārjana
Marjanam is also known as Mantrasnānam (bath with mantras). Mantras commonly used here praise water as a source of nourishment, medicines and energy.

Mantrācamana
Mantrācamanaṃ or Jalaprāśanaṃ is sipping of water by reciting relevant Vedic mantras for internal purification in order to perform ritual acts. One offers water consecrated by mantras in the fire present in the mouth – contemplating that body, mind and heart have been cleansed. Sins specified include: Mental, i.e. evil thoughts, anger, Oral, i.e. lies, abuses and Physical, i.e. theft, prohibited sexual act, consuming undesirable food, crushing creatures under the feet. Seek emancipation of sins committed during the day or night.

Punarmārjana
Smṛtyācāmana is performed two times. Then the Punarmārjanaṃ, or second cleansing is done.

Aghamarṣaṇaṃ
Aghamarṣaṇaṃ is intended to liberate from sins with a few drops of water in the hand, chant the related mantra and mentally induce 'Pāpapuruṣa' to come out through the nose into the water and it is throw it away to the left side. In Yajurveda sandhya, the meaning of mantra is

Arghyapradāna

One Smṛtyācāmana and one Prāṇāyāma are performed. Then, arghyapradāna means offering of water to the Sun with two hands as laid down in the Grihyasutras. A handful of water is taken in two hands cupped together, standing in front of the Sun. Then recite the Sāvitri (i.e. Gayatri mantra) preceded by the vyāhṛtis and the pranava (i.e. om kāra). Arghya has to be offered thrice. These three arghyas destroy the mandeha rakshasas fighting the Sun every sandhya.. If there is delay in sandhya by exceeding the sandhya time, then Prāyaścitta arghya (i.e. fourth one) is given.

Sandhyopāsanā (Dhyāna)
The sun is then contemplated as the brahman (i.e.the supreme reality) through the mantra asā'vādityo brahmā (Sanskrit:असाऽवादित्यो ब्रह्मा, lit. this Āditya is indeed the Brahman). Smartas who adhere to advaita utter additional verse So'ham asmi. Aham brahmāsmi. (Sanskrit:सोऽहमस्मि। अहं ब्रह्मास्मि॥, lit. this is I. I am Brahman).

Tarpaṇaṃ
Then, two times Smṛtyācāmana and three times Prāṇāyāma are performed. Tarpana is a term in the Vedic practice which refers to an offering made to divine entities, where some water is taken in the right hand and poured over the straightened fingers. In Sandhyā, Four devatarpaṇas are offered for Sandhyā devata.

Gāyatrī āhvānam
In Gāyatrī āhvānam (lit. invitation of Gāyatrī), the Sandhyādevata is invited by relevant Vedic mantras. One Śrautācāmana and one Prāṇāyāma are performed. Then Gāyatrī japa sankalpa is told.

Nyāsa
In nyāsa mental appropriation or assignment of various parts of the body to tutelary deities is done just before and after Gāyatrī japam. There are two nyāsas, karanyāsa and aṅganyāsa that involves "ritualistic placing of the finger over the different parts of the body as prescribed" with related ancillary mantras. When done before japa, aṅganyāsa ends with the utterance digbandhaḥ (invoking protection from eight cardinals) and when done after, it ends with the utterance digvimokaḥ (releasing the protection). Then, Gāyatrīdhyāna mantra is uttered.

Mudrāpradarśanam

Mudrāpradarśana is showing different mudras   before and after the japa. These mudras are to be shown just after nyāsa. The mudras in Sandhyāvandanam are 32 in number, where 24 are pūrva mudras shown before the japa and the remaining 8 are shown after it. After showing 24 mudras, the following sloka that emphasizes on showing mudras is to be uttered:

Gāyatrī mantra (Japa)

Just before the japa, the Gāyatrī mantrārtha śloka that gives the meaning of Gayatri mantra is uttered.
The Gayatri mantra is chanted either 1008, 108, 54, 28 or at least 10 times using some japamāla or even karamāla. Meditation upon the solar deity is done. He is considered the absolute reality (i.e. Parabrahman) settled in the lotus heart (hṛtpadma) of all beings. The counting should be made on the right hand which should be covered with a cloth.

There are 3 ways of doing a Japa, namely, vācika, where the mantra is pronounced clearly and aloud, upāmśu, where the lips move quietly and only the meditator hears the mantra and mānasa (or mānasika), purely mental recitation of the mantra.

Gāyatrī japāvasānam
One Śrautācāmana and one Prāṇāyāma are performed. Then Gāyatrī japāvasāna sankalpa is told. Then, nyasa is again performed; this time ending with the utterance digvimokaḥ and Gāyatrīdhyāna mantra is uttered. After that the remaining 8 uttara mudras are shown.

Then, the fruit of japa is offered to Brahman by uttering Om tat sat brahmārpaṇam astu (Sanskrit:ॐ तत्सत् ब्रह्मार्पणमस्तु, lit. That is truth; (fruit of japa) offered to Brahman).

Sūryopasthānaṃ
One Smṛtyācāmana and three times Prāṇāyāma are performed. In upasthānaṃ, some mantras related to Mitra (in the morning), Surya (in the solar noon) and Varuna (in the evening) are chanted by standing and facing towards sun. In the morning face east, in the noon face north and in the evening face west.

Digdevata vandanam
Digdevata vandanam or Dik Namaskāraḥ involves prayers to the lords of the cardinal directions, Indra, Agni, Yama, Nirutha, Varuna, Vayu, Soma, Eeashana, Brahma and Vishnu. They are witnesses to all our deeds. The ideals represented by each of them will provide a direction to us in our march ahead.

Then, Munina maskāraḥ and Devatā namaskāraḥ are performed, where salutations to the munis and devatas. Among smartas, additionally, Hariharābheda smaraṇam is done by smartas to contemplate on the oneness of Siva and Vishnu.

Gāyatrī Prasthānam
Gāyatrī Prasthānam or Udvāsana involves bidding  farewell to the Sandhyādevata by relevant Vedic mantras.

Nārāyaṇābhivandanam
Lord Nārayaṇa is hailed by chanting relevant mantra.

Bhūmyākāśa ābhivandanam
The Sky (Dyaus Pitṛ) and the Earth (Pṛthivī) are offered salutations by considering them as parents by Sāṣṭāṅga Namaskāra with relevant Vedic mantras from Taittiriya Brahamana.

Iśvara Prārthanā
Lord Vāsudeva (i.e. Krishna) is hailed by chanting relevant mantras.

Abhivādanam
It is formal salutation by reciting one's Gotra and Pravara. It is also an expression of gratitude to the teachers (Rishis) for transmitting divine wisdom to the next generation. It is customary to mention the name, gotra, pravara, adhered dharmasutra (of Kalpa) and the Veda followed along with its śakha (recension).

A typical abhivādana(recitation of pravara) of a Yajuevedin is as follows

In the above abhivādana, Kshatriyas and Vyshyas replace śarmā with varmā and guptā respectively.

Samarpaṇam
One Purāṇācamana and one Smṛtyācāmana are performed. Then, Samarpaṇam is done to note that the entire process was undertaken with an intent to please Him as per His directions. The fruits of such act are also placed at His disposal. He distributes them equitably. A philosophy of total surrender to Him is embedded here. This can only mollify our pride and implant humility.

Kṣamāpaṇam
Finally, Kṣamāpaṇam (lit. begging pardon (from the God)) is done to seek pardon for acts of omission / error that might have been committed by chanting three of His names thrice.Even with best of intentions and utmost care, inadequacies can creep in. It pays to look back, correct mistakes and strive to improvise.

Daily duties of Brahmins
Doing Sandhya-vandana first creates the eligibility for a Brahmin to do all rituals following it. Rituals done without doing sandhya-vandanam are regarded as fruitless by Dharmaśāstra. Thus, sandhyavandanam forms the basis or regarded as the foundation for all other vedic rituals. After doing Sandhyavandanam ( mādhyāhnika-sandhyā ) to get rid off sins occurred due preparation of lunch like boiling rice, cutting vegetables, burning firewood etc. In Vaishvadeva homa rice cakes are offered to vishvadevas (all devatas).

As per Śāṅkhāyana-gṛhya-sūtra Adhyāya II, Khaṇḍa 9, a person should go in the forest, with a piece of wood in his hand, seated, he performs the Sandhyā (twilight/dusk?) constantly, observing silence, turning his face north-west, to the region between the chief (west) point and the intermediate (north-western) point (of the horizon), until the stars appear and by murmuring the Mahāvyāhṛtis, the Sāvitrī, and the auspicious hymns when (Sandhya-dusk?) passed. In the same way during dawn, turning his face to the east, standing, until the disk of the sun appears. And when (the sun) has risen, the study (of the Veda) goes on.

Miscellaneous

Other aspects of the ritual, though, speaking strictly, not included in Sandhyavandanam, may include meditation, chanting of other mantras (Sanskrit: japa), and devotional practices specifically for divinities that are preferred by the practitioner. Regarding the connection with meditation practices, Monier-Williams notes that if regarded as an act of meditation, the  may be connected with the etymology .

Depending on the beliefs — Smartha, Sri Vaishnava, Madhva — these mantras or procedures have slight changes, while the main mantras like mārjanaṃ (sprinkling of water), prāśanaṃ (drinking water), punar-mārjanaṃ  and arghya-pradānaṃ remain the same in 95% of the cases. Smārtas (Advaitins) have aikyānu-Sandhānam, where they (Yajur Vedins) recite the verse from bṛhadāraṇyaka Upanishad ( brahmair vāhaṃ asmi ). Sivaprasad Bhattacharya defines it as the "Hindu code of liturgical prayers."

See also
Aupasana
Brahmin
Yajurveda
Veda
Śāstra pramāṇam in Hinduism

Bibliography

References

Sources
 (fourth revised & enlarged edition).
 (First Edition).
 (fourth revised & enlarged edition).
 Second edition, four volumes, revised and enlarged, 1956 (volume IV).
 (Second Revised Edition).
 (Second Revised Edition).

Notes

Rituals in Hindu worship
Hindu prayer and meditation
Meditation
Evening